Arun Nagial (born January 1994) is an Indian professional footballer who plays as a defender for Kerala United FC in the I-League 2nd Division.

Career

Real Kashmir
In July 2018, Nagial was signed for Real Kashmir in the I-League.

Kerala United
On 1 September 2021, Kerala United FC announced the signing of Nagial on a two-year contract.

Downtown Heroes FC 
In March 2023, Nagial was signed by Downtown Heroes FC to play in Hero 2nd Division League.

Honours

Club
Real Kashmir
Kashmir Invitational Cup: 2018
IFA Shield: 2020

References

External links

1994 births
People from Jammu (city)
Footballers from Jammu and Kashmir
Association football defenders
Real Kashmir FC players
Kerala United FC players
Living people
Indian footballers